Massachusetts Senate's 5th Middlesex district in the United States is one of 40 legislative districts of the Massachusetts Senate. It covers portions of Middlesex county. Democrat Jason Lewis of Winchester has represented the district since 2014.

Locales represented
The district includes the following localities:
 Malden
 Melrose
 Reading
 Stoneham
 Wakefield
 Winchester

Former locales

The district previously covered the following:
 Acton, circa 1860s-1870s
 Ashby, circa 1860s-1870s
 Ayer, circa 1870s
 Boxborough, circa 1860s-1870s
 Carlisle, circa 1860s-1870s
 Chelmsford, circa 1870s
 Concord, circa 1860s-1870s
 Dracut, circa 1870s
 Dunstable, circa 1860s-1870s
 Groton, circa 1860s-1870s
 Hudson, circa 1860s-1870s
 Lincoln, circa 1860s-1870s
 Littleton, circa 1860s-1870s
 Marlborough, circa 1860s
 Maynard, circa 1870s
 Pepperell, circa 1860s-1870s
 Shirley, circa 1860s-1870s
 Stow, circa 1860s-1870s
 Sudbury, circa 1860s-1870s
 Townsend, circa 1860s-1870s
 Tyngsborough, circa 1860s-1870s
 Westford, circa 1860s-1870s

Senators 
 Horace Conn, circa 1859 
 John Mitchell
 Charles Sumner Smith
 John Gibbs
 George G. Moyse, circa 1935 
 Richard I. Furbush, circa 1945 
 William E. Hays, circa 1957 
 James DeNormandie, circa 1969 
 Carol Campbell Amick, 1978-1989 
 Lucile P. Hicks, 1991-1996
 Katherine Clark
 Jason M. Lewis, April 16, 2014-current

Images
Portraits of legislators

See also
 List of Massachusetts Senate elections
 List of Massachusetts General Courts
 List of former districts of the Massachusetts Senate
 Middlesex County districts of the Massachusetts House of Representatives: 1st, 2nd, 3rd, 4th, 5th, 6th, 7th, 8th, 9th, 10th, 11th, 12th, 13th, 14th, 15th, 16th, 17th, 18th, 19th, 20th, 21st, 22nd, 23rd, 24th, 25th, 26th, 27th, 28th, 29th, 30th, 31st, 32nd, 33rd, 34th, 35th, 36th, 37th

References

External links
 Ballotpedia
  (State Senate district information based on U.S. Census Bureau's American Community Survey).
 

Senate 
Government of Middlesex County, Massachusetts
Massachusetts Senate